This list of museums in Wiltshire, England contains museums which are defined for this context as institutions (including nonprofit organizations, government entities, and private businesses) that collect and care for objects of cultural, artistic, scientific, or historical interest and make their collections or related exhibits available for public viewing. Also included are non-profit art galleries and university art galleries.  Museums that exist only in cyberspace (i.e., virtual museums) are not included.

Museums

Defunct museums
 Castle Combe Museum, Castle Combe, closed in 2012.
 Coate Agricultural Museum at Coate WaterCountry Park, closed and subsequently destroyed by fire in December 2016.

See also
:Category:Tourist attractions in Wiltshire

References

 
Wiltshire
Museums